This is a complete list of bridges and dams that span the Beaver River from its confluence at the Mahoning River and the Shenango River to its mouth at the Ohio River, near Pittsburgh.

Crossings

See also

References

Beaver River